Copromyzinae is a subfamily of flies belonging to the family Lesser Dung flies.

Genera
 Achaetothorax Hedicke, 1923
 Alloborborus Duda, 1923
 Antrops Enderlein, 1909
 Archiborborus Duda, 1921
 Borborillus Duda, 1923
 Copromyza Fallén, 1810
 Crumomyia Macquart, 1835
 Dudaia Hedicke, 1923
 Frutillaria Richards, 1961
 Gymnometopina Hedicke, 1923
 Lotophila Lioy, 1864
 Immoderatus Papp, 2004
 Metaborborus Vanschuytbroeck, 1948
 Norrbomia Papp, 1988
 Palaeoceroptera Duda, 1929
 Palaeolimosina Duda, 1920
 Penola Richards, 1941
 Pycnopota Bezzi, 1927
 Richardsia Papp, 1973

References

Sphaeroceridae
Muscomorph flies of Europe
Brachycera subfamilies